Carl Struve (April 12, 1887 – November 26, 1974) was a Norwegian actor and singer. He studied singing with Wilhelm Kloed and made his debut at the National Theater in Oslo in 1908. Struve was engaged with the theater until 1919, when he also made his US debut. He also performed at a number of theaters in Stockholm, Finland, and the UK from 1921 to 1928. From 1935 to 1959 he worked as an actor at the Central Theater.

As a singer, Struve mastered a demanding repertoire, and he was praised for his role as Canio in Pagliacci.

Lead roles in operas 
 Carmen as Don José
 Mignon as Wilhelm Meister
 Madama Butterfly as B. F. Pinkerton
 The Tales of Hoffmann as Hoffmann

Roles as a stage actor 
 Pygmalion as Alfred Doolittle
 Rosmersholm as Ulrik Brendel

Filmography 

 1936: Morderen uten ansikt as Berge, a country merchant
 1940: Tørres Snørtevold as a lawyer
 1941: Hansen og Hansen as Blunke
 1943: Den nye lægen as Øyvind, Ulrich's younger brother 
 1944: En herre med bart as Byberg, a mason
 1946: To liv as Gustafsen
 1948: Det var en gang as the wanderer
 1948: Trollfossen as Melsom, a board member
 1950: Min kone er uskyldig as the guest at hotel in Norway
 1951: Kranes konditori as Buck, a lawyer
 1954: I moralens navn as Balthazar Krahn-Johnsen
 1961: Den store barnedåpen (television theater) as the priest

References

External links
 
 Carl Struve at the Swedish Film Database
 Carl Struve at Filmfront
 Carl Struve at Sceneweb

1887 births
1974 deaths
20th-century Norwegian actors
20th-century Norwegian male singers
20th-century Norwegian singers
People from Halden
Burials at the Cemetery of Our Saviour